"The Girl from New York City" is a song written by Brian Wilson and Mike Love for the American rock band The Beach Boys. It was released on their 1965 album Summer Days (and Summer Nights!!). It was written as an answer song to The Ad Libs' hit from earlier that year, "The Boy from New York City".

Other appearances

Aside from appearing on Summer Days (and Summer Nights!!), "The Girl from New York City" has since appeared on many other Beach Boys releases. The song was released in Greece as the B-side to "Wild Honey." The song also appeared on the UK version of compilation album, Best of The Beach Boys Vol. 2, as well as Capitol Years, another compilation album.

Critical opinion

"The Girl from New York City" was described as "well done" by AllMusic writer Richie Unterberger, but he felt that the track didn't "break new ground." Author Jim Fuselli described the track as a throwback "to the group's happy-go-lucky days."

Personnel

The Beach Boys

Sourced from Craig Slowinski.

Al Jardine – harmony vocals, backing vocals, Fender bass
Bruce Johnston – backing vocals, upright piano
Mike Love – lead vocals, bass vocals
Brian Wilson – backing vocals
Carl Wilson – backing vocals, 12-string lead guitar

Other
Hal Blaine – drums
Steve Douglas – baritone saxophone
Jack Nimitz – baritone saxophone
Clifford Hils – upright bass
Ray Pohlman – Danelectro 6-string bass guitar

References

1965 songs
The Beach Boys songs
Songs written by Brian Wilson
Songs written by Mike Love
Song recordings produced by Brian Wilson
Answer songs